Major-General Sir Kenneth Gray Buchanan  (25 January 1880 – 7 June 1973) was a British Army officer.

Military career
Buchanan was commissioned into the Seaforth Highlanders on 20 January 1900. He saw action on the Western Front during the First World War for which he was appointed a Companion of the Distinguished Service Order. He became commander of 154th Infantry Brigade in September 1917. His service in the war also earned him an appointment as a Companion of the Order of St Michael and St George.

Buchanan went on to become a general staff officer at Northern Command in 1928 and commander of 2nd Infantry Brigade in March 1930. After being appointed a Companion of the Order of the Bath in the 1934 New Year Honours, he became General Officer Commanding 42nd (East Lancashire) Infantry Division in March 1934 before retiring in March 1938.

He was appointed a Knight Bachelor in the 1946 New Year Honours for his work as Secretary of the Council of Voluntary War Work during the Second World War.

References

1880 births
1973 deaths
Military personnel from South Lanarkshire
Companions of the Order of the Bath
Companions of the Order of St Michael and St George
Companions of the Distinguished Service Order
Seaforth Highlanders officers
British Army generals of World War I
British Army major generals